The AEC 661T was a two-axle double deck trolleybus chassis manufactured by AEC between 1931 and 1942. Based on the AEC Regent bus chassis, 330 were built for United Kingdom operators.

References

661
Trolleybuses
Vehicles introduced in 1931